Ellis Street Graded School Historic District is a national historic district located at Salisbury, Rowan County, North Carolina.  The district encompasses 76 contributing buildings and 1 contributing structure in a predominantly residential section of Salisbury.  They were built between about 1867 and 1948, and include notable examples of Italianate and Bungalow / American Craftsman style architecture.  Notable contributing resources include the Ellis Street Graded School building (1881) and Shober Bridge (c. 1940).

It was listed on the National Register of Historic Places in 1999.

References

Historic districts on the National Register of Historic Places in North Carolina
Italianate architecture in North Carolina
Buildings and structures in Rowan County, North Carolina
National Register of Historic Places in Rowan County, North Carolina